The subcostal vein is a vein in the human body that runs along the bottom of the twelfth rib.  It has the same essential qualities as the posterior intercostal veins, except that it cannot be considered intercostal because it is not between two ribs.

Each subcostal vein gives off a posterior (dorsal) branch which has a similar distribution to the posterior ramus of an intercostal artery.

See also
 Subcostal nerve
 Subcostal artery

External links
 http://www.instantanatomy.net/thorax/vessels/vinsuperiormediastinum.html

Veins of the torso